is a city located in central Shizuoka Prefecture, Japan. ,  the city had an estimated population of 132,507 in 56,655 households, and a population density of 340 persons per km².

History
The city name comes from the former shrine name of Fujisan Hongū Sengen Taisha, "Fujinomiya". It is an ancient settlement that developed as a properous toriimae-machi (town in front of torii) of Fujisan Hongū Sengen Taisha, where the Fuji clan served as the high priest of the shrine. Nearby is the sanctuary of Taiseki-ji temple, founded in 1290 by Nikkō Shōnin as the headquarters of Nichiren Shōshū Buddhism.

Fujinomiya is closely related to Mount Fuji, and was located in the crossroad of Ōmiya and Murayamaguchi mountain pilgrimage trails. During the Kamakura period, the hunting event Fuji no Makigari arranged by shogun Minamoto no Yoritomo was held in the ancient region of Fujino, where the Revenge of the Soga Brothers incident also took place. These events were disseminated as historical materials such as Ōrai Mono (historical primary education textbooks created mainly in the form of letters), and as the subject of entertainment such as kabuki, noh, and jōruri.

Fujinomiya was a post town (fortified during the Sengoku period) on the primary route connecting Suruga with Kai Province. During the Edo period, the area was tenryō territory under direct control of the Tokugawa shogunate. British consul Sir Rutherford Alcock made the first recorded ascent on Mount Fuji by a non-Japanese person from Fujinomiya in 1860. During the cadastral reform of the early Meiji period in 1889, the area was reorganized into Omiya Town and eight villages with Fuji District, Shizuoka.

On 1 June 1942, the modern city was established with the merger of Omiya town with neighboring Fujioka village. The city expanded by annexing neighboring Fujine village in 1955, and Kitayama, Shiraito, Kamiide and Ueno villages in 1956.

From 1987, Aum Shinrikyo had their headquarters in the city.

The most recent merger was on 23 March 2010, when the town of Shibakawa (from Fuji District) was merged into Fujinomiya.

Geography
Much of the city lies within the borders of Fuji-Hakone-Izu National Park. Fujinomiya is known as one of the main starting points for climbing trips to Mount Fuji, the summit of which is partly within the borders of the city. As with most of Shizuoka Prefecture, the area enjoys a warm maritime climate with hot, humid summers and mild, cool winters.

Surrounding municipalities
Shizuoka Prefecture
Shimizu-ku, Shizuoka
Fuji
Gotemba
Oyama
Yamanashi Prefecture
Nanbu
Minobu
Narusawa
Fujikawaguchiko
Fujiyoshida

Demographics
Per Japanese census data, the population of Fujinomiya has steadily increased over the past 50 years.

Climate
The city has a climate characterized by hot and humid summers, and relatively mild winters (Köppen climate classification Cfa).  The average annual temperature in Fujinomiya is 14.9 °C. The average annual rainfall is 1881 mm with September as the wettest month. The temperatures are highest on average in August, at around 26.1 °C, and lowest in January, at around 4.4 °C.

Government
Fujinomiya has a mayor-council form of government with a directly elected mayor and a unicameral city legislature of 22 members.

Economy
Fujinomiya is an industrial center within Shizuoka Prefecture, traditionally with a heavy emphasis on the paper industry. Other manufacturing industries include rotating equipment, automotive parts, chemicals and pharmaceuticals.

Education
Fujinomiya has 21 public elementary schools and 13 public junior high schools operated by the city government. The city has four public high schools operated by the Shizuoka Prefectural Board of Education. The city also has one private junior school, and two private high schools. The prefectural Shizuoka Prefectural Agriculture and Forestry College is also located in Fujinomiya.

Transportation

Railway
 Central Japan Railway Company - Minobu Line
 -  -  -  -  -

Highway
Nishi-Fuji Road (connects to Tōmei Expressway)

Bus
Fuji Kyūkō
Fuji-Kyū Shizuoka Bus
Sankō town coach
Fujinomiya Station - Tokyo International Airport Express Bus
Fujinomiya Station - Tokyo Station Express Bus
Kyoto/Osaka line Express Bus

Sister city relations
  Santa Monica, California, United States since July 21, 1975
  Shaoxing, Zhejiang Province, China, since November 11, 1997

Local attractions
Fujinomiya is famous for 
Mount Fuji
Taisekiji Temple
Fujisan Hongū Sengen Taisha
Shiraito Falls
Asagiri Plateau
Lake Tanuki
Sengo ruins
Ōshikakubo ruins
Yamamiya Sengen-jinja

Festivals
Hatsumōde (Fujisan Hongū Sengen Taisha)
Yabusame (Horseback archery) Festival (May 4, 5, 6)
Oyamabiraki (opening of climbing season) July 1
Gojinka-festival (August)
Fujinomiya Autumn Festival (November 3, 4, 5)

Events
 The 13th World Scout Jamboree was held August 2–10, 1971 on Asagiri Heights on the western side of Mount Fuji.
 The 9th ISF Women's World Championship was held in Fujinomiya, in 1998.

Noted people from Fujinomiya
Kumiko Akiyoshi - actress
Mizuki Sano - singer
Kōtarō Satomi - actor
Kaori Shimizu - singer
Takahiro Yamada (Asian Kung-Fu Generation)
Masaaki Sawanobori - professional soccer player
Shinsuke Tayama - Olympic athlete
Toshie Uematsu - professional wrestler
Yasuhiro Hiraoka - professional soccer player
Yutaka Yoshida - professional soccer player
Hirotsugu Akaike - statistician

Gallery

References

External links
  
 Official Shizuoka Prefecture homepage
 FUJISAN HONGU SENGENTAISHA official website
 2013 archive of a Fujinomiya Trail Climbing Guide
 Mount Fuji Fujinomiya Trail Climbing Guide at Fujisan Network
 Fujinomiya info
 Fujinomiya Tourist Association

 
Cities in Shizuoka Prefecture